Ilona Maher (born August 12, 1996) is an American rugby union player. She debuted for the  against Japan in 2018 in Paris, France.

Rugby career 
Maher began playing rugby while attending Quinnipiac University; prior to college, she also played field hockey, basketball, and soccer.

In 2021 Maher played rugby sevens at the 2020 Summer Olympics in Tokyo. While attending the Olympics, she released several videos on TikTok that went viral. She was selected again to represent the United States at the 2022 Rugby World Cup Sevens in Cape Town.

Personal life
Maher attended Burlington High School. In 2018, she graduated with a degree in Nursing from the Quinnipiac University.

References

External links 
 Ilona Maher at USA Rugby
 
 
 

1996 births
Living people
American female rugby union players
United States women's international rugby union players
Quinnipiac University alumni
American female rugby sevens players
Rugby sevens players at the 2020 Summer Olympics
Olympic rugby sevens players of the United States
Pan American Games medalists in rugby sevens
Pan American Games silver medalists for the United States
Rugby sevens players at the 2019 Pan American Games
Medalists at the 2019 Pan American Games
21st-century American women
Burlington High School (Vermont) alumni